The Feast of the Circumcision of Christ is a Christian celebration of the circumcision of Jesus in accordance with Jewish tradition, eight days (according to the Semitic and southern European calculation of intervals of days) after his birth, the occasion on which the child was formally given his name.

The circumcision of Jesus has traditionally been seen, as in the popular 14th-century work the Golden Legend, as the first time the blood of Christ was shed, and thus the beginning of the process of the redemption of man, and a demonstration that Christ is fully human, and of his obedience to Biblical law.

The feast day appears on 1 January in the liturgical calendar of Eastern Orthodox churches, all Lutheran churches, and some churches of the Anglican Communion (while the Divine Maternity of Mary is observed on 26 December in the Byzantine rite, both in Greek Orthodox and Byzantine Catholic churches). In the General Roman Calendar, the 1 January feast, which from 1568 to 1960 was called "The Circumcision of the Lord and the Octave of the Nativity", is now the Solemnity of Mary, Mother of God, and the Octave Day of the Nativity of the Lord. In Western Christianity, the Feast of the Naming and Circumcision of Jesus Christ marks the eighth day (octave day) of Christmastide.

Textual sources 
And when eight days were fulfilled to circumcise the child, his name was called Jesus, the name called by the angel before he was conceived in the womb.

Eastern Orthodox churches 
The feast is celebrated with an All-Night Vigil, beginning the evening of December 31. The hymns of the feast are combined with those for Saint Basil the Great. After the Divine Liturgy the next morning, Russian churches often celebrate a New Year Molieben (service of intercession) to pray for God's blessing for the beginning of the civil New Year (Byzantine Christians commemorate the Indiction, or Ecclesiastical New Year, on September 1).

On the Julian calendar, 1 January will correspond, until 2100, to 14 January on the Gregorian Calendar. Accordingly, in Russia, 14 January in the civil calendar is known as "The Old New Year", since it corresponds to 1 January in the Julian Calendar, still used by the Church.

Latin Church
At an early stage the Church in Rome celebrated on 1 January a feast that it called the anniversary (Natale) of the Mother of God. In the 13th or 14th century 1 January began to be celebrated in Rome, as already in Spain and Gaul, as the feast of the Circumcision of the Lord and the Octave of the Nativity, while still oriented towards Mary and Christmas. The  emphasis that Saint Bernardino of Siena (1380–1444) laid on the name of Jesus in his preaching led in 1721 to the institution of a separate Feast of the Holy Name of Jesus. Pope John XXIII's General Roman Calendar of 1960 calls 1 January simply the Octave of the Nativity. (This 1960 calendar was incorporated into the 1962 Roman Missal.) The 1969 revision states: "1 January, the Octave Day of the Nativity of the Lord, is the Solemnity of Mary, the Holy Mother of God, and also the commemoration of the conferral of the Most Holy Name of Jesus."

Lutheran Church
As the Circumcision of Our Lord is a feast of Christ and related directly to the life of Christ as recounted in Holy Scripture (notably Luke 2:21), it is celebrated by Lutheran churches. It remains on Lutheran liturgical calendars to this day, although some Lutherans now use the title "The Circumcision and the Name of Jesus"  or simply "The Name of Jesus."  Martin Luther preached at least one notable sermon on this feast day, which is still available in his Church Postils, and most Lutheran hymnals prior to the 1978 Lutheran Book of Worship contain several hymns for the occasion.

Anglican Communion
The Anglican Communion's Book of Common Prayer liturgy celebrates this day as the Circumcision of Christ.

Since 2000, the Common Worship of the Church of England has listed this day as "The Naming and Circumcision of Jesus."

The Book of Common Prayer of the Anglican Church of Canada calls it "The Octave Day of Christmas, and the Circumcision of Our Lord, being New Year's Day".

The 1979 Book of Common Prayer of the Episcopal Church (United States) names this day "The Holy Name of Our Lord Jesus Christ", a Feast of the Lord.

A Prayer Book for Australia (1995) of the Anglican Church of Australia calls it "The Naming and Circumcision of Jesus".

See also
Circumcision in the Bible
Feast of the Holy Name of Jesus
Holy prepuce

References

External links 
 Russia Orthodox explanation of The Circumcision ("Obrezanie") of the Lord
 An essay on the feast of the circumcision from Anglicans Online

Eastern Orthodox liturgical days
Christmastide
January observances
Circumcision
Nativity of Jesus
Christ Child
Life of Jesus in the New Testament
New Year's Day